Robert Ernest Robinson (21 May 1914 – 1 March 2001) was an Australian rules footballer who played with Fitzroy in the Victorian Football League (VFL) and West Perth in the West Australian Football League (WAFL).		

After playing a single game for West Perth in 1939, Robinson played five games for Fitzroy during the early days of his service in the Royal Australian Air Force in World War II.

Notes

External links 

		
Bob Robinson's playing statistics from WAFL Footy Facts

1914 births
2001 deaths
Australian rules footballers from Western Australia
West Perth Football Club players
Fitzroy Football Club players
Australian military personnel of World War II